José Manuel is a Spanish given name. Some people with the name:

People
 José Manuel Aguirre Miramón (1813-1887), Spanish jurist and politician
 José Manuel Balmaceda (1840-1891), Chilean president
 José Manuel Hernández (1853-1921), Venezuelan army general and politician
 José Manuel Abdalá (1957-2014), Mexican journalist and politician
 José Manuel Andoin (1914-unknown), Spanish sports shooter
 José Manuel Bento dos Santos (born 1947), Portuguese cook and chemical engineer
 José Manuel Angel (born 1948), Salvadoran football midfielder
 José Manuel Beirán (born 1956), Spanish basketball player
 José Manuel Barreiro (born 1957), Spanish politician
 José Manuel Abascal (born 1958), Spanish 1500m runner
 José Manuel Albentosa (born 1965), Spanish long-distance runner
 José Manuel Agüero Tovar (born 1971), Mexican politician
 José Manuel Albares (born 1972), Spanish diplomat
 José Manuel (footballer) (born 1973), Spanish football defender
 José Manuel Abundis (born 1973), Mexican football forward
 José Manuel Arcos (born 1974), Spanish pole vaulter
 José Manuel Aira (born 1976), Mexican football manager and defender
 José Manuel Balbiani (born 1978), Argentine racing driver
 José Manuel Babak (born 1988), Paraguayan football midfielder
 José Manuel Alcañiz (born 1990), Spanish footballer
 José Manuel Nicolás Ayén (born 2003), Spanish footballer

See also
 José Manuel (disambiguation)

Spanish masculine given names